Deanna Needell is an American applied mathematician at the University of California, Los Angeles. She authors The Needell in the Haystack, a column published in the Girls' Angle Bulletin.

Education

Deanna Needell received her PhD in mathematics from the University of California, Davis in 2009.  Her dissertation title was Topics in Compressed Sensing.

Awards and honours

Rachel Ward and Deanna Needell received the IMA Prize in Mathematics and Applications in 2016. The award recognized their theoretical work related to medical sensing and MRIs, with Needell recognized in particular for her contributions to sparse approximation, signal processing, and stochastic optimization. She was named a Fellow of the American Mathematical Society, in the 2022 class of fellows, "for contributions to compressed sensing and the mathematics of data".

References

External links
Home page

American women mathematicians
Living people
Year of birth missing (living people)
University of California, Davis alumni
Fellows of the American Mathematical Society
21st-century American women